Second Heat is the second studio album by American heavy metal band Racer X, was released on February 11, 1987, through Shrapnel Records.

Critical reception

In a contemporary review, Rock Hard defines Second Heat "a thoroughly convincing piece of work, which can also boast an unusually impressive production" and predicted that Paul Gilbert would be "the first Shrapnel guitarist, who will make a name for himself beyond the circle of guitar freaks."

Andy Hinds at AllMusic considered Second Heat superior to its predecessor and described it as having "some of the most amazing dual-guitar work ever recorded" thanks to the addition of second guitarist Bruce Bouillet in accompaniment with Gilbert. The rhythm section of drummer Scott Travis and bassist John Alderete was also praised as being "one of the most formidable around." Highlights listed included "Hammer Away", "Living the Hard Way" and the instrumental "Scarified". However, criticism was directed at the band's cover of "Moonage Daydream" by David Bowie: Hinds dismissed it as a "backdrop for (you guessed it!) more shredding" at the expense of "all the charm and subtlety of the original". Canadian journalist Martin Popoff found the album "hobbled by the rudimentary, cloddish, New Jersey rock club tones" and cited as the "most memorable thing about this album" the cover of Judas Priest's "Heart of a Lion", "apparently given to the band by Halford without Downings's or Tipton's knowledge."

In 2005, Second Heat was ranked No. 480 in Rock Hard magazine's book of The 500 Greatest Rock & Metal Albums of All Time.

Track listing

Personnel
Racer X
Jeff Martin – vocals
Paul Gilbert – guitar
Bruce Bouillet – guitar
Juan Alderete – bass
Scott Travis – drums

Additional musicians
Mike Mani – keyboard (tracks 4, 6)

Technical
Steve Fontano – producer, engineer
Dino Alden – assistant engineer
George Horn – mastering at Fantasy Studios in Berkeley, California
Mike Varney – executive producer
Dino Alden – coordinator
Guy Aitchison – cover art

References

External links
In Review: Racer X "Second Heat" at Guitar Nine Records

Racer X (band) albums
1987 albums
Shrapnel Records albums
Albums produced by Mike Varney